Weijian Zhou is a geologist at the Chinese Academy of Sciences known for her research into environmental changes in the Quaternary era using radiocarbon data.

Education and career 

Zhou graduated from Guizhou University in 1976. She earned her Ph.D. in 1995 from North-West University in China in 1995, and her Ph.D. won the “First National Prize for the One Hundred Most Outstanding PhD Theses in China”. In 1999, she became a professor in the Institute of Earth Environment at the Chinese Academy of Sciences in Xi'an, China. In 2006 she began her position as the director of the Xi'an Accelerator Mass Spectrometry Center.

In 2016, she was named a fellow of the American Geophysical Union who cited her "for exceptional contributions to radiocarbon dating and our understanding of East Asian and global environmental changes using radionuclides as tracers".

Research 
Weijian Zhou is known for using Accelerator mass spectrometry data to track geochemical tracers such as beryllium-10 in loess and Carbon-14. Through these data streams, Zhou studies tochronostratigraphy in the Quaternary era, the period from 2.9 million years ago to the present. Her research has provided insights into the monsoons in China, and records of ancient rainfall through tracking of beryllium-10 in dust layers. During the COVID-19 pandemic, Zhou's research showed carbon dioxide concentrations were lower than previous years, but this decrease was short-lived because values returned to pre-pandemic levels when lockdown restrictions were lifted.

Selected publications

Awards and honors 
 Academician, Division of Earth Sciences, Chinese Academy of Sciences (2009)
 Elected member, Academy of Sciences for the Developing World (2010)
 Fellow, American Geophysical Union (2016)

References 

Fellows of the American Geophysical Union
Members of the Chinese Academy of Sciences
Guizhou University alumni
North-West University alumni
Chinese women chemists
Chinese geologists
Chinese geochemists
Year of birth missing (living people)
Living people